A flue is a duct, pipe, or chimney for removing exhaust gases to the outdoors.

Flue may also refer to:
 27764 von Flüe, a minor planet
 Flue pipe, a type of organ pipe
 Äbeni Flue, a mountain in the Bernese Alps in Switzerland
 Tiejer Flue, a mountain in the Swiss Alps
  Part of a one flue harpoon, a type of harpoon
  Parts of a two flue harpoon, an earlier type of harpoon

People named Flue
 Jason Von Flue (born 1975), mixed martial artist
 Saint Nicholas of Flüe (1417–1487), Swiss hermit and patron saint of Switzerland